Myiopagis is a genus of bird in the family Tyrannidae, the tyrant flycatchers. These species are closely related to the genus Elaenia but are generally smaller.

The genus contains the following 9 species:

References

 
Tyrannidae
Taxa named by Osbert Salvin
Taxa named by Frederick DuCane Godman
Taxonomy articles created by Polbot